Turret Cone is a small summit (c.455 m) that is locally conspicuous, located 3.8 nautical miles (7 km) east of Cape Royds and 3 nautical miles (6 km) northeast of Cape Barne on Ross Island. Descriptively named by Griffith Taylor of the British Antarctic Expedition, 1910–13.

Mountains of Ross Island